Roland Kenneth Bernard (March 14, 1916 – June 24, 1953) was an American football player and coach.  He served as the head football coach at North Carolina Agricultural and Technical State University in 1941 and at Arkansas Agricultural, Mechanical & Normal College—now known as the University of Arkansas at Pine Bluff—from 1950 to 1952, compiling a career college football record of 14–21–4.  Bernard died of a heart attack on June 24, 1953 in Pine Bluff, Arkansas.

Head coaching record

References

1916 births
1953 deaths
Arkansas–Pine Bluff Golden Lions football coaches
Boston University Terriers football players
North Carolina A&T Aggies football coaches
Sportspeople from Cambridge, Massachusetts
Sportspeople from Chelsea, Massachusetts
United States Army personnel of World War II